Mai Văn Phấn is a Vietnamese poet, literary critic.

Biography
Mai Văn Phấn was born 1955 in Ninh Bình, Red River Delta in North Vietnam. He joined the army infantry in 1974. Mai Văn Phấn left the army in 1981 and entered Hanoi College of Foreign Languages, Department of Linguistics and Russian culture. Continued learning in 1983 at Maxim Gorky Pedagogics School, Minsk, (Capital of the Byelorussian SSR). Winner of numerous awards for poetry in Viet Nam: “Poetry contest” of Weekly Người Hà Nội in 1994. “Poetry contest” of Weekly Văn Nghệ 1995. “Literature” of celebrity culture Nguyễn Bỉnh Khiêm (Hải Phòng city) in 1991, 1993, 1994, 1995. Recipient of the prestigious “Vietnam Writers' Association” Award in 2010; The Cikada Literary Prize of Sweden in 2017; The Award of Serbian Academy of Sciences and Arts in 2019 and The Literary award from Association of Literary Translators of Montenegro in 2020; Four times won the Golden Pen Literature Award of Russian Federation in 2019, 2020, 2021, 2022; won the Golden Pen Literature Award of Russian Federation, 2019, 2020 and 2021; The Award Aco Karamanov of North Macedonia in 2020; 1st Prize in The International Creative Meeting and Festival “Together in the XXI Century” in Bulgaria 2020; The medal Alisher Navoi of the Union of Writers and Historians of Central Asia in 2021; Winner of Sahitto (Bangladesh) International Award for Literature 2021; The Award of Newspaper Kitob Dunyosi (Uzbekistan) in 2021; The Award of the International Slavic Literary Forum "Golden Knight" in 2022; The Poetry Collection of Year Award of Boao International Poetry Award (China) in 2022 (for the Poetry Collection "Улетел на рассвете"); The Award of the International Poetry Competition "My heart in the Mountains" named writer William Saroyan, Republic of Armenia in 2022.

Notable works
He has published 16 poetry books and one book, Critiques - Essays in Vietnam. 29 of his poetry books are published and released in foreign countries.

NATIONALLY PUBLISHED BOOKS:
 “Giọt nắng” (“Drops of Sunlight”. Poetry book in Vietnamese. Hải Phòng Writer's Association, 1992);
 “Gọi xanh” (“Calling to the Blue”. Poetry book in Vietnamese. Publishing House of The Vietnam Writer’s Association, 1995);
 “Cầu nguyện ban mai” (“Prayers to Dawn”. Poetry book in Vietnamese. Hải Phòng Publishing House, 1997);
 “Nghi lễ nhận tên” (“Ritual of Naming”. Poetry book in Vietnamese. Hải Phòng Publishing House, 1999);
 “Người cùng thời” (“People of the Era” in Vietnamese, Hải Phòng Publishing House, 1999);
 “Vách nước” (“Water Wall”. Poetry book in Vietnamese. Hải Phòng Publishing House, 2003);
 “Hôm sau” (“The Day After”. Poetry book in Vietnamese. Publishing House of The Vietnam Writer’s Association, 2009);
 “và đột nhiên gió thổi” (“and Suddenly the Wind Blows”. Poetry book in Vietnamese. Literature Publishing House, 2009);
 “Bầu trời không mái che” (Vietnamese-only version of “Firmament Without Roof Cover". Poetry book in Vietnamese. Publishing House of The Vietnam Writer’s Association, 2010);
 “Thơ tuyển Mai Văn Phấn” (Mai Văn Phấn: Selected Poems - Essays and the Interviews in Vietnamese. Publishing House of The Vietnam Writer’s Association, 2011);
 “hoa giấu mặt” (“hidden-face Flower”. Poetry book in Vietnamese. Publishing House of The Vietnam Writer’s Association, 2012);
 “Bầu trời không mái che / Firmament Without Roof Cover” (Bilingual poetry book in Vietnamese - English. Publishing House of The Vietnam Writer’s Association, 2012);
 “Vừa sinh ra ở đó” (“Just Born There”. Poetry book in Vietnamese. Publishing House of The Vietnam Writer’s Association, 2013);
 “A Ciel Ouvert ("Firmament Without Roof Cover”. Bilingual poetry book in Vietnamese - French. Publishing House of The Vietnam Writer’s Association, 2014);
 “The Selected Poems of Mai Văn Phấn” in English (Publishing House of The Vietnam Writer’s Association, 2015);
 “thả” (“letting go”. Poetry book in Vietnamese. Publishing House of The Vietnam Writer’s Association, 2015);
 “Không gian khác” (“Another Dimension”. Critiques - Essays in Vietnamese. Publishing House of The Vietnam Writer’s Association, 2016); 
 "Lặng yên cho nước chảy" ("Be Quiet for Water Flowing”. Poetry book in Vietnamese. Publishing House of The Vietnam Writer’s Association, 2018);
 "Thời tái chế" (“Era of Junk”. Poetry book in Vietnamese. Publishing House of The Vietnam Writer’s Association, 2018).

INTERNATIONALLY PUBLISHED BOOKS:
 “Firmament Without Roof Cover” (English version. Page Addie Press, 2012);
 “Những hạt giống của đêm và ngày / Seeds of Night and Day” (Bilingual poetry book in Vietnamese - English. Page Addie Press of United Kingdom, 2013);
 “Những hạt giống của đêm và ngày / Seeds of Night and Day” (Bilingual poetry book in Vietnamese - English. Page Addie Press of United Kingdom; Publishing House of The Vietnam Writer’s Association, 2013);
 “A Ciel Ouvert ("Firmament Without Roof Cover”. Bilingual poetry book in Vietnamese - French. Page Addie Press of United Kingdom; Publishing House of The Vietnam Writer’s Association, 2014);
 “Buông tay cho trời rạng / Out of the Dark” (Bilingual poetry book in Vietnamese - English. Page Addie Press of United Kingdom; Publishing House of The Vietnam Writer’s Association, 2013);
 “Ra vườn chùa xem cắt cỏ / Grass Cutting in a Temple Garden”(Bilingual poetry book in Vietnamese - English. Page Addie Pressof United Kingdom Australia, 2014);
 “Zanore në vesë / Vowels in The Dew” (Poetry book in Albanian. Botimet M&B, Albania, 2014);
 “บุษบาซ่อนหน้า / hidden face flower / hoa giấu mặt” (Poetry book in Thai, English and Vietnamese. Artist's House, Thailand, 2014);
 “Yên Tử Dağının Çiçeği” (“The Flower of Mount Yên Tử”. Poetry book in Turkish. Şiirden Yayincilik, Turkey, 2015);
 “आलाप प्रतिलाप” (“Echo of the Aalap”. Poetry book in Hindi. Publishing House of Kritya, India, 2016);
 “Два крыла / Đôi cánh” (“Two Wings”. Bilingual Poetry book in Vietnamese - Russian. “Нонпарелъ” - Publishing House of Moscow, 2016);
 "Варијације у кишнојноћи" ("Variations on a Rainy Night". Poetry book in Serbian. Publisher "Алма, Београд", Republic of Serbia, 2017);
 “Echoes from the Spiral Galaxy” (Poetry book in English. Publisher Mundus Artium Press, USA, 2017);
 “Höstens hastighet” (“The Pace of Autumn”. Poetry book in Swedish. Publisher "Tranan", Sweden, 2017); 
 “সত্যের সন্ধানে” (In Search of Truth. Poetry book in Bengali, India). Publisher: Underground Literature, Kolkata, 2018);
 대양의 쌍둥이 (“Born as Twins in an Ocean”. Poetry book in Korean with poet 고형렬 / Ko Hyung-Ryul). Publisher: 시와 표현 (Poetry & Expression) of S. Korea, 2018);
 حيث تتسع السماء (“Where the Sky Is Spacious”. Poetry book in Arabic. Alfarasha Publishing House, Kuwait, 2019);
 «Время утиля / Thời tái chế» (“Era of Junk”. Bilingual poetry book in Russian - Vietnamese. Publishing House of Voronezh: Центр духовного возрождения Черноземного края, Russia, 2020);
 «Ära des Mülls / Era of Junk” (“Era of Junk”. Bilingual poetry book in  German - English. Publishing House of Germany: Shaker Media, 2020);
 “Қабоҳат даври” (“Age of Ignorance”.  Poetry book in Uzbek. Publishing House of Uzbekistan: Янги аср авлоди, 2020;
 “Kapanahunan ng Basura” (“Era of Junk”).  Poetry book in Filipino. Publishing House: University of the Philippines Institute of Creative Writing and The Freelipiniana Online Library, 2020;
 “재처리 시대” (“Era of Junk”). Poetry book in Korean. Publishing House: 이도훈 (Dohun), 2020;
 “और उड़ चला मन पांखी” (“And Flew Away Heart”). Poetry book in Hindi. Publishing House Notion Press, India, 2020;
 „НОВОГОДИШНО КАПЕЊЕ„ (“New Year Bath”) of Mai Văn Phấn with „ЗАЧУДЕН БАРУТ„  (“Buffled Gunpowder”) of Raed Anis Al-Yishi. Poetry book in Macedonian. Publishing House: Center of Culture "Aco Karamanov" Radovish, 2020;
 “लाल आत्माएं” (“The Scarlet Spirits”). Poetry book in Hindi. Publishing House Hind Yugm, India, 2021;
 «Если в дороге ... дождь ... / Nếu trên đường… mưa…» ("If on the road… rain...). Bilingual poetry book in Russian - Vietnamese by Svetlana Savitskaya, translated from Russian into Vietnamese by Mai Văn Phấn. Publishing House Academy N.E. Zhukovsky, Moscow, 2021);
 “Ойнинг туғилган куни” (“The Birthday of the Moon”). Poetry book in Uzbek. Publishing House of Uzbekistan: Arjumand Media, 2021;
 "Улетел на рассвете" ("Fly Away at Dawn"). Poetry book in Russian. Publishing House "Четыре" (Saint Petersburg), 2021;
 “Skrottid” (“Era of Junk”). Poetry book in Swedish. Publisher "Tranan", Sweden, 2022);
 "Gün doğarkən" (“At Sunrise”. Poetry book in Azerbaijani. Publisher Bakı, Azerbaijan, 2022).

Poems of Mai Văn Phấn are translated into more than 40 languages.

His poems have appeared in more than 50 anthologies, including Poetry NZ 36 (New Zealand) Poetry Kit Magazine 5 & 6 (British); Poesy Magazine 33, Fulcrum 3, The Writers Post volume 6, 7 & 8, Wordbridge (US); Poem and Comment Magazine (S. Korean); Softblow Poetry Journal (Singapore), Literature Newspaper (Indonesia); Tranan (Sweden).

External links

"Creation Was A Process of Escape from Personality”
"Should a poet think of his responsibility or mission upon his poetic creation?"
"When one has to live, has the right to live and read”
"Another way leading to the modern Vietnamese Poetry”
“Poetry will carry the beauty inside the soul of Vietnamese people to humankind”
Vietnamese poet scales top ten list on Amazon
The poetry of Mai Văn Phấn expresses the radiance of being human here and now on this earth.
Gjekë Marinaj sjell ne shqip poetin e e shquar vietnamez Mai Van Phan
Des pluies de sources
The Affirmation of Reality in the poetry of Mai Văn Phấn

20th-century Vietnamese poets
1955 births
Living people
Vietnamese male poets
20th-century male writers